Xing Aiying (born 2 August 1989) is a Chinese-born Singaporean former badminton player who competed at the 2008 Summer Olympics.

Early life 
Xing was born in Jiangsu, China, and she is a former Nanjing city age-group champion in 1998. She came to Singapore in 2003 and became the Chinese youngest player to join the Singapore Badminton Association (SBA).

Career 
Xing started her debut in international tournament at the 2003 Thailand King's Cup. In 2004, she was the women's doubles runner-up at the Croatian International tournament, and won her first international title at the World Badminton Grand Prix event U.S. Open in the singles event at the age of 15.

In 2005, she reached the final round in the women's singles event at the Bitburger Open and Cheers Asian Satellite tournaments. In Ballarat International, she won the women's doubles event and the runner-up in singles event. In 2006, she competed in the women's team event at the Uber Cup and Doha Asian Games. The team reached the quarter-final at the Uber Cup, and won the bronze medal at the Asian Games. She also competed at the Melbourne Commonwealth Games in the mixed team and singles event, and lost to Malaysian players Wong Mew Choo in the quarter-final. At the 2006 New Zealand Open, she was seeded fourth at that tournament, and unexpected lost in the final round to Huang Chia-chi of Australia in the rubber game. In 2007, she won her first national title in the women's singles event, and repeat her success in 2013. She also won the mixed team bronze at the World Junior Championships and women's team silver at the SEA Games. In 2008, she was the runner-up at the Vietnam Open and semi-finalist in Thailand Open. Xing qualified for the women's singles at the 2008 Summer Olympics in Beijing, after she was ranked thirty-sixth in the world, and awarded an entry as one of the top 38 seeded players by the Badminton World Federation. She lost the first preliminary round match to Belarus' Olga Konon, with a score of 19–21 and 12–21.

In 2009, she was the quarter-finalist at the Malaysia Grand Prix Gold, and also won the women's team bronze at the SEA Games. In 2010, she helps the Singapore team to reach the semi-final round in the mixed team event at the Delhi Commonwealth Games. At the bronze medal match against England, she won the match to Elizabeth Cann, but the team went down 1-3 and missed out on the bronze. In 2011 and 2012, she won the women's singles title at the Singapore International Series tournament. She also won the bronze medal at the 2011 SEA Games in the women's team event. In 2012, she also the runner-up in the national championships, and was the semi-finalist at the Malaysia Grand Prix Gold and Singapore Open Superseries tournament. In 2013, Xing reached the quarter-final round at the U.S. Open, and at the same year, she resigned from the SBA. Together with the former Singaporean national player Mok Jing Qiong, the duo crowned champion at the 2014 Singapore National Games.

Achievements

BWF Grand Prix 
The BWF Grand Prix had two levels, the Grand Prix and Grand Prix Gold. It was a series of badminton tournaments sanctioned by the Badminton World Federation (BWF) and played between 2007 and 2017. The World Badminton Grand Prix was sanctioned by the International Badminton Federation from 1983 to 2006.

Women's singles

BWF International Challenge/Series 
Women's singles

Women's doubles

  BWF International Challenge tournament
  BWF International Series tournament

References

External links 
 
 
 
 
 
 
 

1989 births
Living people
Badminton players from Jiangsu
Chinese emigrants to Singapore
Singaporean sportspeople of Chinese descent
Naturalised citizens of Singapore
Chinese female badminton players
Singaporean female badminton players
Badminton players at the 2008 Summer Olympics
Olympic badminton players of Singapore
Badminton players at the 2006 Asian Games
Asian Games bronze medalists for Singapore
Asian Games medalists in badminton
Medalists at the 2006 Asian Games
Badminton players at the 2006 Commonwealth Games
Badminton players at the 2010 Commonwealth Games
Commonwealth Games competitors for Singapore
Competitors at the 2005 Southeast Asian Games
Competitors at the 2007 Southeast Asian Games
Competitors at the 2009 Southeast Asian Games
Competitors at the 2011 Southeast Asian Games
Southeast Asian Games silver medalists for Singapore
Southeast Asian Games bronze medalists for Singapore
Southeast Asian Games medalists in badminton